Przemysław Kamiński (born 8 April 1996) is a Polish footballer who plays in defence. He is currently without a club having last played for Wierzyca Pelplin in 2019.

Senior career

Kamiński began his career with Lechia Gdańsk, with whom he failed to make an appearance for the first team, but played for the Lechia second team for the 2013-14 season. In 2014 he joined Concordia Elbląg, where he spent the next 3 years of his career. In January 2017, Kamiński joined Gryf Wejherowo. In total he played 34 times in the league for Gryf, before once again returning to Concordia Elbląg in 2018.

References

 1996 births
Lechia Gdańsk II players
Polish footballers
Association football defenders
Sportspeople from Gdańsk
Sportspeople from Pomeranian Voivodeship
Living people